The All-Russia Thermal Engineering Institute was an organisation founded by the Soviet of Labor and Defense “for the purpose of systematic studying and working-out the vital practical issues in heat engineering and for solving related technical and economic problems, as well as for training high-skilled specialists” on July 13, 1921. The idea came from two professors at the Imperial Moscow Technical School, Vasily Ignatievich Grinevetsky and Karl Vasilievich Kirsh.

The first director was Leonid Ramzin

Research institutes in Russia
Research institutes in the Soviet Union